Fulton United Methodist Church  is a historic Methodist church located near Advance, Davie County, North Carolina. It was built in 1888, and is a one-story, brick building with vernacular Gothic Revival and Italianate design elements. It features a steeply pitched gable roof, bracket cornices, a large pointed arch window, and engaged five-stage tower.

It was added to the National Register of Historic Places in 1979.

References

United Methodist churches in North Carolina
Churches on the National Register of Historic Places in North Carolina
Gothic Revival church buildings in North Carolina
Italianate architecture in North Carolina
Churches completed in 1889
19th-century Methodist church buildings in the United States
Buildings and structures in Davie County, North Carolina
National Register of Historic Places in Davie County, North Carolina
Italianate church buildings in the United States